West Ham or Westham may refer to:

West Ham, London, England, a suburb 
County Borough of West Ham, a former administrative division 
West Ham (UK Parliament constituency)
West Ham United F.C., a football club 
West Ham station
Westham, East Sussex, England, a village 
 Pevensey & Westham railway station
Westham Halt railway station, Dorset, England
Westham, Virginia, United States, a former unincorporated community 
 Westham Bridge, bridge over the James River
 Westham Station, Henrico County; a train station
Westham Island, Delta, B.C., Canada, an island in Greater Vancouver 
 Westham Island Bridge, a bridge to the island 
West Ham, fictional town in The Society (TV series), an American teen drama

See also

 
 
 
 Ham (disambiguation)
 West (disambiguation)